KP in Ukraine is a Ukrainian newspaper published six times a week in Kyiv, the nation's capital. It is a Ukrainian language newspaper with some regional editions in the Russian language.

In March 2009 the paper was awarded a "Newspaper of the Year 2008" award.

In order to comply with Ukrainian decommunization laws the newspaper changed its name from Komsomolskaya Pravda in Ukraine to KP in January 2016. But the newspaper stressed it was never a "mouthpiece" of the Komsomol, the youth wing of the Communist Party of the Soviet Union.

It is part of United Media Holding group, created by Boris Lozhkin and owned by Serhiy Kurchenko.

See also
 Komsomolskaya Pravda

References

External links
Official website 

Publications established in 1996
Russian-language newspapers published in Ukraine
Ukrainian-language newspapers
Mass media in Kyiv
Ukrainian news websites
Daily newspapers published in Ukraine